Gulruh Rahimova (born 29 September 1992) is an Uzbekistani Paralympic judoka. She represented Uzbekistan at the 2016 Summer Paralympics held in Rio de Janeiro, Brazil and she won one of the bronze medals in the women's 70 kg event.

In 2017, she won the bronze medal in the women's middleweight event at the 2017 Islamic Solidarity Games held in Baku, Azerbaijan.

References

External links 

 

1992 births
Living people
Uzbekistani female judoka
Paralympic judoka of Uzbekistan
Paralympic bronze medalists for Uzbekistan
Paralympic medalists in judo
Judoka at the 2016 Summer Paralympics
Medalists at the 2016 Summer Paralympics
Place of birth missing (living people)
21st-century Uzbekistani women